Pjetër Bua (or Boua; fl. 1450s) was an Albanian nobleman of the late medieval Despotate of the Morea (Peloponnese) who was the chief instigator of the Morea revolt of 1453–1454. After the revolt, he was recognized by the Ottoman Empire as the official representative of the Albanians of the Morea.

Biography
Pjetër Bua was a member of the Albanian Bua family. Shortly after the fall of Constantinople and the death of the last Byzantine emperor, Constantine XI (r. 1449–1453), 30,000 Albanians led by Peter Bua rose in revolt against the two Despots of the Morea, Thomas and Demetrius II, due to the heavy tributes they had to pay. After the revolt failed, the Ottoman sultan Mehmed II (r. 1444‒1446; 1451‒1481), surnamed the Conqueror, recognized Pjetër Bua as the spokesperson of the Albanian population of the Morea. For a period of time, Pjetër Bua ruled the areas of the Morea that hadn't been conquered by the Ottomans.

References

Citations

Sources

15th-century Albanian people
People of the Despotate of the Morea
Peter
Medieval Albanian nobility
Venetian Albanians